Live & Direct is an album by American blues artist Taj Mahal and the International Rhythm Band.

Critical reception
Rolling Stone wrote that "the African-inspired songs here are slight, the Brazilian excursion sounds tired, and the funk and R&B numbers are simply not credible."

Track listing
All tracks composed by Taj Mahal; except where indicated
 "Jorge Ben" (Jorge Ben, Taj Mahal)
 "Reggae Number 1"
 "You're Gonna Need Somebody" (Buffy Sainte-Marie)
 "Little Brown Dog" (Traditional)
 "Take a Giant Step" (Gerry Goffin, Carole King)
 "L-O-V-E, Love"
 "And Who" (Robert Greenidge, Rudy Costa, Taj Mahal)
 "Suva Serenade"
 "Airplay"

Personnel
Taj Mahal - lead vocals, electric piano
The International Rhythm Band
Bill Rich - bass
Kester Smith - drums
Jumma Santos - percussion, congas, timbales
Robert Greenidge - steel drums
Rudy Costa - alto and soprano saxophone, flute, pan pipe, kalimba
Bianca Oden, Carey Williams, Ella Jamerson, Geri Johnson, Ola Marie Tyler, Verlin Sandles - backing vocals

References

1979 live albums
Taj Mahal (musician) live albums